The following is a list of ecoregions in Ireland as identified by the World Wide Fund for Nature (WWF).

Terrestrial ecoregions
listed by realm, then by biome:

Palearctic realm

Temperate broadleaf and mixed forests
 Celtic broadleaf forests
 North Atlantic moist mixed forests

Freshwater ecoregions
 Northern British Isles

Marine ecoregions
listed by marine realm, then marine province:

Temperate Northern Atlantic realm

Northern European Seas province
 Celtic Seas

 
Ireland
ecoregions

References 
 Abell, R., M. Thieme, C. Revenga, M. Bryer, M. Kottelat, N. Bogutskaya, B. Coad, N. Mandrak, S. Contreras-Balderas, W. Bussing, M. L. J. Stiassny, P. Skelton, G. R. Allen, P. Unmack, A. Naseka, R. Ng, N. Sindorf, J. Robertson, E. Armijo, J. Higgins, T. J. Heibel, E. Wikramanayake, D. Olson, H. L. Lopez, R. E. d. Reis, J. G. Lundberg, M. H. Sabaj Perez, and P. Petry. (2008). Freshwater ecoregions of the world: A new map of biogeographic units for freshwater biodiversity conservation. BioScience 58:403-414, .
 Spalding, Mark D., Helen E. Fox, Gerald R. Allen, Nick Davidson et al. "Marine Ecoregions of the World: A Bioregionalization of Coastal and Shelf Areas". Bioscience Vol. 57 No. 7, July/August 2007, pp. 573–583.